Electro Freeze is a company that manufactures frozen dessert machines, like soft serve machines, shake machines, slush machines, batch freezers, etc., and is owned by H C Duke & Son. It is most known for being the soft serve machine used by Dairy Queen, as well as many other Soft Serve Ice Cream establishments.

Kitchenware brands